The 1875 Grand National was the 37th renewal of the Grand National horse race that took place at Aintree near Liverpool, England, on 18 March 1875.

Finishing Order

Non-finishers

References

 1875
Grand National
Grand National
19th century in Lancashire